Hungarian Recording Industry Association (Hungarian: Magyar Hanglemezkiadók Szövetsége, more commonly abbreviated to MAHASZ or Mahasz) is the Hungarian music industry association, founded in 1992. MAHASZ issues the Hungarian Music Awards, awards music recording certification and maintains the music charts for Hungary.

Charts
Mahasz runs the following weekly charts:
 Album Top 40
 Radio Top 40
 Editor's Choice Top 40
 Hungarian Radio Top 40
 Dance Top 40
 Single Top 40
 Stream Top 40

Certification levels
Since 1 January 2018, MAHASZ combined all music recording certification into one combined "album" certifications, which includes albums and singles of all genres and origins. For Gold status an album needs to sell 2,000 units and for Platinum 4,000 units, where ten singles are counted as one album. The certification also includes streaming at a rate of 1,000 paid streams or 5,000 free streams per album.

Certification levels history

Certifications have existed in Hungary since the mid-1970s. During that period, albums had to sell 50,000 units to qualify for Gold status and singles required 100,000 units.

Over the years, Mahasz awarded certifications for albums, singled and music videos (DVDs).

Albums
For pop albums, separate thresholds were in place for domestic repertoire and international repertoire, as follows.

Mahasz certified classical music, jazz, world music and prose albums, requiring 1,500 units for Gold and 3,000 units for Platinum.

Singles
For singles, the same thresholds applied independent of the origin and genre.

Music videos (DVDs)
For music videos (DVDs), the same thresholds applied independent of the origin.

Jazz, classical, world music and prose DVDs were certified at 1,000 for Gold and 2,000 for Platinum.

Highest certified albums
The highest certified albums by MAHASZ are Micsoda buli! by Hungária and Legendás dalok 1. by Locomotiv GT, both certified 10× Platinum in 2014. The highest certified international repertoire album is Mamma Mia! The Movie Soundtrack by the Mamma Mia! film cast, certified 6× Platinum in 2018. Below is a list of all albums that have been certified multi-platinum by MAHASZ, .

See also
 List of artists who reached number one in Hungary
 List of number-one singles of the 2000s (Hungary)
 List of number-one singles of the 2010s (Hungary)
 List of number-one singles of the 2020s (Hungary)

References

External links
 MAHASZ official website

Music industry associations
Music organisations based in Hungary
Organizations established in 1992
1992 establishments in Hungary